The 2002 World Weightlifting Championships were held in Warsaw, Poland from 19 November to 26 November. The women's +75 kilograms division was staged on 24 November 2002.

Schedule

Medalists

Records

Results

References
Weightlifting World Championships Seniors Statistics, Page 40 
Results 

2002 World Weightlifting Championships